The Da'an River is a river in northwestern Taiwan. It reaches the Taiwan Strait between the Dajia District and Da'an District, Taichung.

The Da'an River was affected by the 1999 Jiji earthquake, where a gorge was formed (called Da'an River Grand Canyon ). In some of the fastest erosion geologists have ever seen, the gorge is being eaten away from its upstream end at a rate of 17 meters per year. They expect the gorge to be erased after 50 years.

See also
 List of rivers in Taiwan

References 

Rivers of Taiwan
Landforms of Miaoli County
Landforms of Taichung